Clementine Mukeka is a Rwandan public administrator who was appointed by H.E. President Paul Kagame as Permanent Secretary in the Ministry of Foreign Affairs and International Cooperation on 15 May 2020.

Education 
Clementine Mukeka was born to Rwandese parents. She attended primary and secondary schools in Europe. 
Mukeka holds a master's degree in Business Management from IDRAC Business School (France), and a bachelor's degree in Business Administration (Major: Economics), from London South Bank University (United Kingdom).
Mukeka also attended the New York University (United States) in International Business courses.

Career 
Before her appointment Mukeka served as Senior Trade Advisor for the United States Agency for International Development  (USAID) Rwanda. She also served as Economic and Commercial Specialist at the U.S Embassy in Rwanda Before joining the U.S. Department of State/ U.S. Mission to Rwanda, she held different positions in the private sector in Europe and the United States. .

References 

21st-century Rwandan women politicians
21st-century Rwandan politicians
Living people
Year of birth missing (living people)